Magleby is a village located in the rural parish of Magleby Stevns, seven kilometres northwest of Store Heddinge on the Stevns Peninsula, Stevns Municipality, some 40 km south of Copenhagen, Denmark. As of 1 January 2022, Magleby had a population of 330 in the village and 1,298 in the parish.

History
 
The oldest parts of Magleby Church dates from the 12th century. The name Magleby is first recorded in 1346 as Magdlæby. Magle- (mikil) means "large" and the suffix -by means town or village.

In the Middle Ages, Magleby belonged to Højstrup Manor until it was sold to the Bishop of Toskilde in 1400 by Folmer Jacobsen Lunge. Roskilde Biscopic established Magleby Fief from its land in the parishes of Magleby, Hellested and Bjæverskov. Most of the land came under Vallø after the Reformation.

The first school in Magleby opened in 1630. It was replaced by a rytterskole in 1721. It was destroyed in a fire in 1727 but soon rebuilt.

Landmarks
The most prominent landmark in the village is Magleby Church. It consists of a Romanesque nave, a Late-Gothic chancel and a tower from 1592-93. The Rytterskole has survived as a wing of the now defunct Magleby School. Lindencrones Hospital is a former poorhouse. Skelbæk Friskole an independent primary school, is located just south of the village.

Transport
Magleby is served by Movia buses 251 and 271.

References

External links

Cities and towns in Region Zealand
Stevns Municipality